Database administrators (DBAs) use specialized software to store and organize data. The role may include capacity planning, installation, configuration, database design, migration, performance monitoring, security, troubleshooting, as well as backup and data recovery.

Skills
Some common and useful skills for database administrators are:
 Knowledge of database queries
 Knowledge of database theory
 Knowledge of database design
 Knowledge about the RDBMS itself, e.g. Microsoft SQL Server or MySQL
 Knowledge of structured query language (SQL), e.g. SQL/PSM or Transact-SQL
 General understanding of distributed computing architectures, e.g. Client–server model
 General understanding of operating system, e.g. Windows or Linux
 General understanding of storage technologies and networking
 General understanding of routine maintenance, recovery, and handling failover of a database

Database administrators benefit from a bachelor's degree or master's degree in computer science. An associate degree or a certificate may be sufficient with work experience.

Certification
There are many certifications available for becoming a certified database administrator. Many of these certifications are offered by database vendors themselves. Database administrator certifications may be earned by passing a series of tests and sometimes other requirements. Schools offering Database Administration degrees can also be found.

For example:
 IBM Certified Advanced Database Administrator – DB2 10.1 for Linux, Unix and Windows
 IBM Certified Database Administrator – DB2 10.1 for Linux, Unix, and Windows
 Oracle Database 12c Administrator Certified Professional
 Oracle MySQL 5.6 Database Administrator Certified Professional
 MCSA SQL Server 2012
 MCSE Data Platform Solutions Expert

See also
 Comparison of database

References

Computer occupations
Data management